Mishka Ziganoff (Odesa, January 15, 1889 – New York City, February 1967) was an American musician born in the Russian Empire.

Biography
Misha Demitro Tsiganoff better known as Mishka Ziganoff (sometimes also spelled as Tziganoff), son of Yanchie Demitro Tsiganoff and Vorgja Nickolama, was a Roma musician originally from Odesa, then part of the Russian Empire, who moved to New York at the beginning of the 20th-century, where he opened a restaurant.

Virtuoso accordionist, Mishka Ziganoff, despite being a Christian, was well versed in Yiddish and Klezmer music.

In 1919 he recorded a disc that contained the song "Koilen", whose melody, as reported by the research by the scholar Fausto Giovannardi, would be very similar and probably would have inspired a part of the melody of the famous Italian partisan song "Bella ciao".

According to the scholar Rod Hamilton, of The British Library in London, "Kolien" would be a version of "Dus Zekele Koilen" (Two bags of coal), of which there are various versions dating back to the 1920s.

He died in New York in February 1967 and was buried in Linden's Rosedale Cemetery.

Ziganoff is mentioned in the 1983 film Angelo, my love, written and directed by Robert Duvall.

References

1889 births
1967 deaths
People from Odesa
Romani people from the Russian Empire
Emigrants from the Russian Empire to the United States